Mohammed Amin Adam (born 15 April 1974) is a Ghanaian politician who is the current Deputy Minister for Energy of Ghana. Prior to becoming the Deputy Minister for Energy, he was the Founder and Executive Director of the Africa Centre for Energy Policy (ACEP). He is currently the Member of Parliarment representing Karaga Constituency in the Northern Region of Ghana.

Early life and education 
Amin was born on 15 April 1974 to late Mariya Abdul Rahaman who died on Tuesday March 10, 2020 after a short illness. He is a Muslim and from Karaga, Northern Region of Ghana. He is a  member of the Danquah-Dombo-Busia Tradition. Amin was educated in the Northern School of Business from 1988 to 1990. He also holds an MPhil (Economics) and Barchelor of Arts (Hons) Economics from the University of Cape Coast; and is a Fellow of the Institute of Certified Economists of Ghana (ICEG). He was the secretary of University branch of the New Patriotic Party (now Known as TESCON), taking over from Mustapha Abdul Hamid currently the chief executive officer of the National Petroleum Authority (NPA). 

He holds a PhD. In Petroleum Economics from Centre for Energy, Petroleum & Mineral Law and Policy (CEPMLP) of the University of Dundee in the United Kingdom (UK).

Career 
He previously worked in other public and private organizations as - an Energy Policy Analyst at the Ministry of Energy in Ghana, Commissioner of Ghana’s Public Utilities Regulatory Commission; a former Deputy Minister of State for the Northern Region; and former Mayor of Ghana’s third city of Tamale. He was also the Africa Coordinator of extractives industries in Ibis.

Political life 
Amin is a member of the New Patriotic Party (NPP). He was elected as the parliamentary candidate of the then opposition NPP for the then Choggu Tishegu constituency, one of two constituencies in Tamale. He was a student studying for Masters of Philosophy (MPhil) in Economics at the University of Cape Coast (UCC) but deferred the programme to seek a parliamentary career.  

When he was unsuccessful in the elections narrowly to the late Abubakari Sumani, he returned to complete his studies and was awarded MPhil. Degree in 2002.  

In 2005, President Kufour appointed him as the Deputy Regional Minister for the Northern Region. He later had the opportunity to serve the people of Tamale when the Kufour appointed him Mayor of the City.   

Amin represented the New Patriotic Party (NPP) as its parliamentary candidate in 2008. Upon the return of the New Patriotic Party (NPP) to political power under the leadership of President Nana Akufo-Addo, he was appointed as a member/secretary of the Energy subcommittee of the New Patriotic Party (NPP) Transition Team and was later appointed by the President as the Deputy Minister of Energy, a position he is currently holding.   

He is currently the Parliamentary Candidate of the New Patriotic Party (NPP) in the Karaga Constituency for the 2020 General Elections, a member of the National Council of the Party, representing the Northern Region, and a member of the Party’s National Elections Committee.

Member of Parliament 
2000 Elections

In 2000, Abubakari Sumani a member of the National Democratic Congress (NDC) won with 18,937 out of the 53,498 valid votes cast, over NPP's Amin who pulled 18,585 votes representing 34.70%, Gamel Nasser Adam of the Convention People's Party (CPP)  polled 13,816 votes representing 25.80%,

See also 

 New Patriotic Party

Reference 

Ghanaian Muslims
1974 births
Members of the Parliament of Ghana
Living people